William Henry Owen Steer (10 October 1888 – 25 November 1969) was an English amateur footballer who played in the Football League for Chelsea as an inside right.

He represented England at amateur level, netting 8 goals in just 6 caps. Steer made his debut for the team against Belgium on 26 March 1910, scoring once in a 2–2 draw. Notably, he scored four goals in a 10–1 trashing of France. Steer was the author of England's only goal in a 1–2 loss to Denmark, which was the amateur's first-ever defeat in almost 4 four years.

Career statistics

International goals
England Amateurs score listed first, score column indicates score after each Steer goal.

References

Footballers from Kingston upon Thames
English footballers
Queens Park Rangers F.C. players
Chelsea F.C. players
Newry City F.C. players
English Football League players
1888 births
1969 deaths
Association football inside forwards
Brentford F.C. wartime guest players
England amateur international footballers